Khaled Farid Kharroubi (born February 11, 1984 in Lyon, France) is an Algerian footballer. He currently plays for Adana Demirspor.

Biography
Kharroubi started playing football at the age of 6 in his neighborhood club US Vénissieux. At the age of 8, he joined the Olympique Lyon academy, and stayed with the club until the age of 15. He would then join the academy at Grenoble Foot for another 4 years, reaching the semi-finals of the Coupe Gambardella, before leaving to Brazil at age 19 to sign with Bangu. After one season, he was loaned out to Série A side Esporte Clube Vitória and at the end of the season he would come back to France to join Valenciennes FC in the French Championnat National. In his first season, he played 33 games and helped the team finish first in the tables gaining promotion to Ligue 2. In his second season, injuries limited him to just 10 games (and 1 goal) but his team still finished first in the standings, gaining promotion to Ligue 1. In his first season in the top flight, Kharroubi again managed just 10 games. Injuries again limited him to just 3 games in his second season in Ligue 1.

On June 4, 2008, he signed a 2-year contract with newly promoted Belgian club FCV Dender. After left Dender he was signed in 2010 by Etoile FC for their debut appearance in the S.League where he was part of the double-winning squad that took the S.League and League Cup titles. Kharroubi now plays for Osotspa Saraburi FC in Thailand.

On August 18, 2016, he signed one year deal with Turkish side Adana Demirspor. On September 21, 2016, he played his first official match for Demirspor against Erzurum BB in a Turkish Cup meeting.

International career
Although born in France, Kharroubi has represented Algeria in international competition. In June, 2005, he was called up to a training camp by the Under-23 national team. In August, 2006, he was called up by Jean-Michel Cavalli to the Algerian National Team for friendlies against FC Istres and Gabon. He started the game against FC Istres but did not feature in the second game.

Honours
 Won the French Championnat National once with Valenciennes FC in 2004/2005
 Won the Ligue 2 Championship once with Valenciennes FC in 2005/2006
 Won the 2010 Singapore League Cup with Etoile FC in 2010
 Won the 2010 S.League with Etoile FC in 2010

Personal
Kharroubi's family hails from the city of Chlef in Algeria and the player has admitted that he is a big fan of local club ASO Chlef.

References

External links 

Player profile - dzfoot.com
DZfoot.com Interview

1984 births
Living people
Algerian footballers
Algeria international footballers
Valenciennes FC players
French sportspeople of Algerian descent
Footballers from Lyon
Ligue 1 players
Ligue 2 players
Singapore Premier League players
Belgian Pro League players
Bangu Atlético Clube players
Esporte Clube Vitória players
F.C.V. Dender E.H. players
MC Oran players
Expatriate footballers in Belgium
Expatriate footballers in Brazil
Expatriate footballers in Singapore
Algerian expatriates in Belgium
Algerian expatriates in Singapore
Expatriate footballers in Thailand
Association football midfielders
Étoile FC players